The 2018 Tunis Open was a professional tennis tournament played on clay courts. It was the tenth edition of the tournament which was part of the 2018 ATP Challenger Tour. It took place in Tunis, Tunisia between 16 and 22 April 2018.

Singles main-draw entrants

Seeds

 1 Rankings are as of 9 April 2018.

Other entrants
The following players received wildcards into the singles main draw:
  Mohamed Ali Bellalouna
  Moez Echargui
  Lamine Ouahab
  Alexei Popyrin

The following player received entry into the singles main draw as a special exempt:
  Nikoloz Basilashvili

The following players received entry from the qualifying draw:
  Daniel Gimeno Traver
  Maxime Janvier
  Zsombor Piros
  Lukáš Rosol

The following player received entry as a lucky loser:
  Daniel Masur

Champions

Singles

 Guido Andreozzi def.  Daniel Gimeno Traver 6–2, 3–0 ret.

Doubles

 Denys Molchanov /  Igor Zelenay def.  Jonathan Eysseric /  Joe Salisbury 7–6(7–4), 6–2.

References

2018 ATP Challenger Tour
2018